Nikki Tilroe (December 26, 1941 – September 1, 2005) was an American actress and puppeteer. She is best known for her work as the "Mime Lady" on the children's television series Today's Special. She also operated Muppets on the TV show Fraggle Rock and played "Beaver" on Cucumber.

Tilroe worked out of Toronto during the 1970s and 1980s, and served as director for Frog Print Theater. In 1975 Tilroe was awarded a "Citation of Excellence in the Art of Puppetry" by Jim Henson. In 1993 she received an Emmy Award as the head puppeteer on the production of The Land of I.

Tilroe appeared on the children's television show Charlie Horse Music Pizza, and was one of three puppeteers to manipulate the "Snuggle Bear", a puppet designed by Kermit Love. Tilroe also taught puppetry courses through several venues, including the University of Hawaii, the Toronto Teacher's College, at festivals and conferences, and through the O'Neill Puppetry Conference. She also wrote about puppetry, including the 1996 booklet, Movement in puppetry performance.

Tilroe worked on the web-produced puppet films for Sammy Snail, and in 2004 she received a grant from The Jim Henson Foundation for a production called Aging, produced with Larry Siegel through Tricinium Limited in Keene, New Hampshire.

Tilroe died aged 63 at her home in Derry, New Hampshire on September 1, 2005. She had been suffering from liver and kidney diseases. Her remains were cremated. In December 2005, The two movies Friday Nights Brights and Escape from Octopus Shores and February 2006, The two movies My Fair Victoria and My Ring are released on Happy Feet Productions in St. Louis as the posthumously releases.

In 2007, the O'Neill Puppetry Conference recognized Tilroe's contribution to puppetry by providing a scholarship in her name. The Nikki Tilroe Scholarship is supported by her family and friends and it is awarded to candidates with a particular interest in "movement and dedication to the art of puppetry".

Filmography
Cucumber (1972) - Beaver, Ecology
Math Patrol (1977)
Today's Special: Live on Stage (1981) - Many characters
Follow That Bird (1985) - Board of Birds
The Christmas Toy (1986) - Ding-a-Ling
Today's Special  (1981–86) - Mime Lady
Fraggle Rock (1983–87) - Merple Merggle
The Wubbulous World of Dr. Seuss (1996) (Episode: The Simplifier)
Water from the Moon (2002)

References

External links

1941 births
2005 deaths
American puppeteers
American television actresses
Actresses from Los Angeles
Actresses from New Hampshire
People from Derry, New Hampshire
20th-century American actresses
21st-century American women
Muppet performers